HMS Leamington was a Hunt-class minesweeper of the Aberdare sub-class built for the Royal Navy during World War I. She was not finished in time to participate in the First World War and was sold for scrap in 1928.

Design and description
The Aberdare sub-class were enlarged versions of the original Hunt-class ships with a more powerful armament. The ships displaced  at normal load. The ships' complement consisted of 74 officers and ratings.

The ships had two vertical triple-expansion steam engines, each driving one shaft, using steam provided by two Yarrow boilers.

The Aberdare sub-class was armed with a quick-firing (QF)  gun forward of the bridge and a QF twelve-pounder (76.2 mm) anti-aircraft gun aft. Some ships were fitted with six- or three-pounder guns in lieu of the twelve-pounder.

Construction and career
HMS Leamington was built by the Ailsa Shipbuilding Company at their shipyard in Troon, Ayrshire. She was  launched on 26 August 1918. The ship was originally named HMS Aldborough, and renamed in 1919. Leamington was sold for scrap on 19 May 1928 to Thos. W. Ward, Pembroke Dock.

See also
 Leamington Spa

Notes

References
 
 
 

 

Hunt-class minesweepers (1916)
1918 ships